GURPS Fantasy Bestiary is a sourcebook for GURPS.

Contents
GURPS Fantasy Bestiary is a supplement for GURPS Magic containing original monsters and creatures found commonly in fantasy settings.

Publication history
GURPS Fantasy Bestiary was written by Steffan O'Sullivan with Steve Jackson and Warren Spector, with a cover by Carol Heyer and illustrations by Tom Baxa, and published as a 128-page book by Steve Jackson Games in 1990.

Reception
Lawrence Schick noted the "Animals with Multiple or Unusual Heads" as his favorite section.

References

Fantasy role-playing game supplements
Fantasy beatiary
Role-playing game supplements introduced in 1990